The Missouri College Athletic Union (MCAU) was an intercollegiate athletic conference that existed from 1924 to 1971. It consisted primarily of private universities from the state of Missouri that departed the Missouri Intercollegiate Athletic Association after its 1924 reorganization. In 1970, the MCAU was reorganized as the Heart of America Athletic Conference. However, the HAAC does not claim the Athletic Union's history.

Member schools

Final members

Former members

Notes

Membership timeline

Football champions

1924 – 
1925 – 
1926 – 
1927 – 
1928 – 
1929 – 
1930 – 
1931 – 
1932 – 
1933 – 
1934 – 
1935 – 
1936 –  and 
1937 –  and 
1938 – 
1939 –  and 

1940 – 
1941 – 
1942 – Missouri Valley
1943 – No champion
1944 – No champion
1945 – No champion
1946 – Missouri Valley
1947 – Missouri Valley
1948 – Missouri Valley
1949 – 
1950 – 
1951 – 
1952 – 
1953 – 
1954 –  and 
1955 – Missouri Valley

1956 – 
1957 – 
1958 – 
1959 – 
1960 –  and 
1961 – 
1962 – 
1963 – 
1964 – 
1965 – 
1966 –  and 
1967 –  and 
1968 – 
1969 –  and 
1970 –

See also
List of defunct college football conferences

References

 
College sports in Missouri
Sports leagues established in 1924
Sports leagues disestablished in 1971
1924 establishments in Missouri
1971 disestablishments in Missouri